, known colloquially as the , , or simply , is a major Japanese private railway operator in Osaka, Kyoto, and Shiga Prefectures. The transit network includes seven lines; four main lines with heavy rolling stock, two interurban lines, and a funicular railway. 

It is subsidiary of Keihan Holdings, Ltd..

History
Keihan started its operation between Osaka and Kyoto in 1910. It was the first electric railway to connect these two cities, and the first line on the left bank of Yodo River. Keihan later purchased the lines in the Ōtsu area (Ōtsu Lines).

In the 1920s, Keihan built another Osaka-Kyoto line through its subsidiary , which merged into Keihan in 1930. This line is now known as the Hankyu Kyoto Line.

In 1949, the pre-war Keihan operations, except for Shinkeihan lines, restored independence under the original corporate name. Keihanshin Kyūkō Railway later changed the name to present Hankyu Railway.

Lines
The lines operated by Keihan are grouped into Keihan Lines and Ōtsu Lines. The former operates between Kyoto and Osaka with long formation of larger rolling stock. The latter runs Kyoto and Ōtsu with more tram-like cars. The entire network has  double track.

Current lines

Keihan Lines
Keihan Main Line/Ōtō Line: Yodoyabashi - Demachiyanagi 
Nakanoshima Line: Nakanoshima - Temmabashi
Katano Line: Hirakatashi - Kisaichi
Uji Line: Chushojima - Uji

Ōtsu Lines
Keishin Line: Misasagi - Biwako-hamaotsu
Ishiyama Sakamoto Line: Ishiyamadera - Sakamoto-hieizanguchi

Other lines
Cable Line (鋼索線), also called Iwashimizu-Hachimangū Cable (石清水八幡宮参道ケーブル)

Closed lines
Keishin Line: Keishin-Sanjo (Sanjo) - Misasagi

Unbuilt line
Umeda Line

Rolling stock
, Keihan owns a fleet of 693 vehicles (including two funicular cars), as follows.

Keihan Lines

 1000 series 7-car EMUs x 6 (introduced 1977)
 2200 series 7-car EMUs x 7 (introduced 1964)
 2400 series 7-car EMUs x 6 (introduced 1969)
 2600 series 7-car EMUs x 7 (introduced 1978)
 3000 series 8-car EMUs x 6 (introduced 2008)
 5000 series 7-car EMUs x 7 (introduced 1970)
 6000 series 7/8-car EMUs x 14 (introduced 1983)
 7000 series 7-car EMUs x 4 (introduced 1989)
 7200 series 7/8-car EMUs x 3 (introduced 1995)
 8000 series 8-car EMUs x 10 (introduced 1989)
 9000 series 7/8-car EMUs x 5 (introduced 1997)
 10000 series 4/7-car EMUs x 6 (introduced 2002)
 13000 series 4/7-car EMUs x 8 (introduced 2012)

Ōtsu Lines
 600 series 2-car EMUs x 10
 700 series 2-car EMUs x 5
 800 series 4-car EMUs x 8 (introduced 1997)

Former rolling stock
 1900 series 5-car EMUs (introduced 1963)
 8030 series 8-car EMU (introduced 1971)

Fares

Train fare varies based on travel distance. As of January 1, 2009, IC cards (PiTaPa and ICOCA) are accepted on the Keihan Lines and the Otsu Lines, but not on the Cable Line.
The fare rate was changed on April 1, 2014 to reflect the change in the rate of consumption tax from 5% to 8%.

Keihan Lines (Keihan Main Line, Oto Line, Nakanoshima Line, Katano Line, Uji Line)

Additional fare when taking or passing the following lines
Oto Line: 60 yen
Nakanoshima Line (Nakanoshima - Oebashi): 60 yen
When using commutation tickets, Naniwabashi Station is treated as the same station as Kitahama Station, and Oebashi Station as that as Yodoyabashi Station.

Otsu Lines (Keishin Line, Ishiyama Sakamoto Line)

Cable line
200 yen

Etymology
This is commonly done in names for regions or train lines, with (as here) the kan-on readings (most common readings in kanji compounds) being used for the compounds, while the place names use other readings. The larger region, including , is similarly called , the go-on reading  replacing the kun'yomi , and the corresponding Kyoto-Kobe line is the  line.

Other businesses
Keihan also operates (through the subsidiaries) other businesses such as bus, taxi, water bus, hotel, department store and amusement park, mainly in the area along its railway system.
 Keihan Cable Line
 Keihan Bus

References

External links

 Keihan Electric Railway 
 Keihan Electric Railway

 
Companies listed on the Osaka Exchange
Railway companies of Japan
Companies based in Osaka Prefecture
Rail transport in Shiga Prefecture
Rail transport in Kyoto Prefecture
Rail transport in Osaka Prefecture
600 V DC railway electrification
1500 V DC railway electrification